Dominique Montel Morrison (born November 29, 1989) is an American professional basketball player for the Centauros de Portuguesa of the Venezuelan SuperLiga. As a college player, he was the 2012 Summit League player of the year and an Associated Press All-American in 2012.

College career
Morrison, a 6'6" forward from Raytown High School in Kansas City, Missouri, played collegiately at Oral Roberts.  There he was a four-year starter for the Golden Eagles, leading the team in scoring for his final three years.  He was also named first team all-conference for three consecutive years, and the Summit League player of the year as a senior.  He was also named an honorable mention All-American by the Associated Press.  For his career, Morrison scored 2,080 points (16.1 points per game).

Professional career
Morrison was part of the New Orleans Hornets' pre-season roster but did not make the final cut. Morrison then joined the Iowa Energy. In January 2013, he was waived by the Energy.

On June 4, 2015, he signed with Liège Basket of the Belgian League. For the 2016–17 season, he joined TED Ankara Kolejliler in Turkey.

On December 19, 2017, Morrison signed with Greek club Rethymno Cretan Kings for the rest of the 2017–18 Greek Basket League season. He was released from the Greek club on March 2, 2018.

On December 28, 2018, Morrison signed with Club Hispano of the Argentine Liga Nacional.

On February 4, 2020, Morrison signed with Nacional of the Liga Uruguaya de Basketball (LUB) and the BCL Americas. On February 3, 2022, Morrison scored a season-high 42 points in a BCL Americas win over Minas.

References

External links
Belgian League profile
Greek League profile
NBA D-League Profile
Oral Roberts Athletic profile

1989 births
Living people
American expatriate basketball people in Argentina
American expatriate basketball people in Greece
American expatriate basketball people in Luxembourg
American expatriate basketball people in Sweden
American expatriate basketball people in Turkey
American men's basketball players
Basketball players from Kansas City, Missouri
Ilysiakos B.C. players
Iowa Energy players
Liège Basket players
Norrköping Dolphins players
Oral Roberts Golden Eagles men's basketball players
Small forwards
TED Ankara Kolejliler players